Matej Vuk (born 10 June 2000) is a Croatian professional footballer who plays as a midfielder for Croatian First Football League club Istra 1961 and the Croatia national under-21 team.

Club career
Born in Čakovec, Međimurje County, growing up in Čehovec near Prelog, Vuk started training football at the local NK Mladost Prelog at the age of 7. Following stints at NK Međimurje and NK Čakovec, Vuk joined the HNK Rijeka academy at the age of 14, where went through all remaining ranks. However, he made his first senior appearances on loan at Inter Zaprešić in 2018. He played his first professional match on 28 July 2018, on the opening day of the 2018–19 season against Lokomotiva. He was in the starting lineup as Zaprešić lost by a score of 0–4 away at Stadion Kranjčevićeva.

In September 2020, Vuk was sent on a one-season loan to Istra. He immediately scored in his first appearance for Istra, opening the score against HNK Gorica on 19 September 2020, as the match ended 2–2. He finished the season as the top goalscorer for the club, scoring six goals in 30 total appearances, before returning to Rijeka.

In December 2022 Vuk rejoined NK Istra 1961, signing a contract until 2025.

International career
Having played for numerous national youth teams, Vuk made his debut for the Croatia under-21 team against Lithuania on 17 November 2020. He was in the starting lineup before being replaced by Luka Ivanušec at half-time in a 7–0 win. He was selected to compete in the 2021 UEFA European Under-21 Championship, where he initially replaced an injured Luka Sučić, but had to withdraw from the tournament himself due to an injury.

Career statistics

Honours
Rijeka
Croatian Cup: 2018–19, 2019–20

References

External links
 
 

2000 births
Living people
Sportspeople from Čakovec
Association football midfielders
Croatian footballers
Croatia youth international footballers
Croatia under-21 international footballers
HNK Rijeka players
NK Inter Zaprešić players
ŠKF Sereď players
NK Istra 1961 players
Croatian Football League players
Slovak Super Liga players
Croatian expatriate footballers
Expatriate footballers in Slovakia
Croatian expatriate sportspeople in Slovakia